Johan Hermann Wilhelm Rupe (October 9, 1866, in Basel – January 12, 1951) was a professor of organic chemistry at the University of Basel. His main field of interest was terpenes and campher as well as optical activity.

Life 
Rupe was born on October 9, 1866 in Basel to Johannes Rupe and Mathilde Rupe (born Fischer) and went to school in Basel. He passed his Maturität in 1885 and then went on to study in Basel under Julius Piccard. He continued his studies at the University of Strasbourg under Rudolf Fittig and then in 1887 in Munich under Adolf von Baeyer. Rupe received his PhD in 1889 at Munich for his dissertation Über die Reduktionsprodukte der Dichloromuconsäure.

In 1894 he went to Mulhouse to become head of the "Chemieschule" in the organic division. Rupe habilitated in 1895 in Basel, where he moved in 1899. In 1903, he became an associate professor for organic chemistry at the University of Basel. He worked with the chemistry Professor Rudolf Nietzki, who retired in 1911.
In 1911 or 1912 , he was promoted to full professor for organic chemistry (while his colleague Friedrich Fichter became professor for inorganic chemistry). During his time as a professor, he supervised nearly 150 students and published over 250 scientific articles.

In 1907, he married Margrit Hagenback, daughter of Eduard Hagenbach-Bischoff with whom he had three children. His wife died in 1926 and in 1933 his youngest son died. In 1936 he married Marguerite Lutz.

Rupe retired in 1937 and died on January 12, 1951.

Honors

 foreign member of the Deutsche Akademie der Naturforscher Leopoldina (1932).
 president and co-founder of the Schweizerischen Chemischen Gesellschaft 
 editor of Helvetica Chimica Acta.

Publications

 Anleitung zum Experimentieren in der Vorlesung über organische Chemie, Braunschweig, 1. Aufl. 1909, 2. Aufl. 1930. 
 Adolf von Baeyer als Lehrer und Forscher. Erinnerungen aus seinem Privatlaboratorium. Stuttgart 1932.

References 

 History page of the University of Basel

1866 births
1951 deaths
Swiss chemists
Academic staff of the University of Basel
Scientists from Basel-Stadt